The 2014 Claro Open Colombia was a professional tennis tournament played on hard courts. It was the second edition of the tournament, which was part of the 2014 ATP World Tour. It took place in Bogotá, Colombia at Centro de Alto Rendimiento, between 14 and 20 July 2014.

Singles main-draw entrants

Seeds 

 1 Rankings are as of July 7, 2014

Other entrants 
The following players received wildcards into the singles main draw:
  Juan Sebastián Cabal
  Eduardo Struvay
  Bernard Tomic

The following players received entry from the qualifying draw: 
  Nicolás Barrientos
  Kevin King
  Juan Ignacio Londero
  James Ward

Withdrawals 
Before the tournament
  Máximo González
  Dmitry Tursunov

Retirements 
  Matthew Ebden (wrist injury)

Doubles main-draw entrants

Seeds 

 1 Rankings are as of July 7, 2014

Other entrants 
The following pairs received wildcards into the doubles main draw:
  Facundo Argüello /  Michael Quintero
  Carlos Salamanca /  Eduardo Struvay

The following pair received entry as alternates:
  César Ramírez /  Bernard Tomic

Withdrawals 
Before the tournament
  Matthew Ebden (wrist injury)

During the tournament
  Radek Štěpánek (left harmstring injury)

Champions

Singles 

  Bernard Tomic def.  Ivo Karlović, 7–6(7–5), 3–6, 7–6(7–4)

Doubles 

  Samuel Groth /  Chris Guccione def.  Nicolás Barrientos /  Juan Sebastián Cabal,  7–6(7–5), 6–7(3–7), [11–9]

References

External links 
 

Claro Open Colombia
Claro Open Colombia
2014 in Colombian tennis